Stanisław Gawłowski (born 27 November 1968 in Rozyna, near Brzeg) is a Polish politician.

Biography
He was elected to the Sejm on 25 September 2005, getting 7879 votes in 40 Koszalin district as a candidate from the Civic Platform list. In 2019 he was elected to the Senate as an independent candidate.

He has been accused of corruption.

See also
Members of Polish Sejm 2005-2007

References

External links
Stanisław Gawłowski - parliamentary page - includes declarations of interest, voting record, and transcripts of speeches.

Civic Platform politicians
1968 births
Living people
Members of the Polish Sejm 2005–2007
Members of the Polish Sejm 2007–2011
Members of the Polish Sejm 2011–2015
Members of the Polish Sejm 2015–2019
Members of the Senate of Poland 2019–2023